Arpa Foundation for Film, Music and Art (AFFMA) is a Los Angeles based non-profit organization, formed in 1995 for the purpose of promoting the arts.

AFFMA has been running its annual Arpa International Film Festival held in Hollywood, California since 1997. Arpa Film Festival claims to be one of the oldest independent film festivals in Hollywood, highlighting films that explore critical issues such as war, genocide, diaspora, dual identities, exile and multiculturalism.  In 2021, the festival went virtual due to COVID, and 2022 marked the 25th anniversary of the festival.

Notes and references

Arts organizations established in 1995
Arts foundations based in the United States
Charities based in California